Tamoya is a genus of box jellyfish within the monotypic family Tamoyidae.

Species
 Tamoya gargantua Haeckel, 1880
 Tamoya haplonema F. Müller, 1859
 Tamoya ohboya Collins, Bentlage, Gillan, Lynn, Morandini, Marques, 2011
 Tamoya ancamori Straehler-Pohl, 2020

References

Tamoyidae
Medusozoa genera